North Greenwich Pier is a pier on the River Thames, London, England. It is situated on the Greenwich Peninsula in south-east London, to the east of the O2. The pier was formerly named QEII Pier after Queen Elizabeth II.

History
North Greenwich Pier was originally built in the 1880s as a coaling jetty for the former Greenwich gasworks before this closed in the late 1980s. Most of the original jetty was demolished in 1997 to make way for the new passenger pier; however eight of the original cast iron caisson columns were retained to secure the new floating pier. Antony Gormley's 'Quantum Cloud' statue stands on the downstream group of four caissons.

Design
The new pier was designed by architect Richard Rogers Partnership with Beckett Rankine as the engineer and Costain as main contractor. The most striking feature of the pier is its 87metre long, 160tonne, bowstring canting brow which, unusually, is supported on three bearings.

Services
The pier is served by river boat services operated by Thames Clippers, including:
 a regular commuter catamaran service, from Barking Riverside and Woolwich Arsenal Pier into central London, via Greenwich, Canary Wharf and Tower Bridge to the London Eye.
 the fast O2 Express service
 A replacement boat service to a pier near East India DLR station when the London Underground Jubilee line is closed for engineering works.

Connections
 North Greenwich Underground station 
 North Greenwich bus station 
 London Cable Car

References

London River Services
Transport in the Royal Borough of Greenwich
Piers in London